Anastasios 'Tasos' Kritikos (born 25 January 1995) is a Greek professional footballer who plays as a forward for Super League 2 club Apollon Smyrnis.

Career
On 7 July 2020, Kritikos signed a two-year contract with Super League side Volos on a free transfer.

Career statistics

Club

References

External links
 Profile at Sportlarissa.gr
 sports academies.gr
 National Team U-17

1995 births
Living people
Greek footballers
Greece youth international footballers
Football League (Greece) players
PAS Giannina F.C. players
Athlitiki Enosi Larissa F.C. players
Anagennisi Karditsa F.C. players
Panserraikos F.C. players
Doxa Drama F.C. players
Volos N.F.C. players
Association football forwards
Footballers from Larissa